Bellemont is an unincorporated community located in Paradise Township, Lancaster County, Pennsylvania.  It is located approximately 1 mile to the southeast of the town of Paradise.

References

Unincorporated communities in Lancaster County, Pennsylvania
Unincorporated communities in Pennsylvania